Mangan is a village in Badghis Province in north western Afghanistan, close to the border with Turkmenistan.

References

External links 
Satellite map at Maplandia.com 

Populated places in Badghis Province